Puntallana is a town and a municipality on the island of La Palma, Province of Santa Cruz de Tenerife, Canary Islands, Spain. It is situated in the northeastern part of the island. The population of the municipality is 2,346 (2013) and the area is 35.10 km². The elevation is 420 m. Puntallana is 7 km northeast of the island capital Santa Cruz de La Palma.

Historical population

See also
List of municipalities in Santa Cruz de Tenerife

References 

Municipalities in La Palma